Hot House Flowers may refer to:
Hot House Flowers, a children's book by John H. Wilson
Hot House Flowers (album), 1984 album by Wynton Marsalis
Hothouse Flowers, an Irish rock group